Gephyroglanis congicus is a species of claroteid catfish endemic to the Democratic Republic of the Congo where it is found in the Congo River system.  This species grows to a length of 43.0 cm (16.9 inches) SL.

References 
 

Claroteidae
Fish of the Democratic Republic of the Congo
Endemic fauna of the Democratic Republic of the Congo
Fish described in 1899